Karpatiosorbus franconica is a species of plant in the family Rosaceae. It is endemic to Little Switzerland in North-Bavaria, Germany.

References

Flora of Germany
franconica
Vulnerable plants
Endemic flora of Germany
Taxonomy articles created by Polbot
Taxobox binomials not recognized by IUCN 
Taxa named by Joseph Friedrich Nicolaus Bornmüller